Henry Guppy may refer to:

 Henry B. Guppy (1854–1926), British botanist
 Henry Guppy (librarian) (1861–1948), British librarian